Josip Bilinovac (born December 30, 1990) is a Croatian professional basketball player currently playing for Rapid București in the Romanian League.

Career 
Bilinovac started his career in HKK Široki in 2008, where he spent eight years.

On August 6, 2015, he signed for Trefl Sopot.

On July 25, 2016, he signed for Jolly JBS.

On July 7, 2017, Bilinovac signed with Cibona. He averaged 5.3 points and 1.8 assists per game in the 2019-20 season. On August 6, he signed a two-year contract with the team.

In February 2021, Bilinovac signed with Quimper playing in the second-tier French LNB Pro B.

In August, 2021, Bilinovac returned to Široki.

In June, 2022, Bilinovac signed for Rapid București of the Romanian League.

References

External links 
 ABA League Profile
 RealGM Profile
 Eurobasket.com Profile

Living people
1990 births
Croatian men's basketball players
HKK Široki players
Trefl Sopot players
Basketball players from Mostar
Croats of Bosnia and Herzegovina
KK Cibona players
Guards (basketball)
UJAP Quimper 29 players